Suzanne Rose Merz (born April 10, 1972) is an American ice hockey player. She won a gold medal at the 1998 Winter Olympics and a silver medal at the 2002 Winter Olympics.

References

External links
bio

1972 births
American women's ice hockey defensemen
Ice hockey players from Connecticut
Ice hockey players at the 1998 Winter Olympics
Ice hockey players at the 2002 Winter Olympics
Living people
Medalists at the 1998 Winter Olympics
Medalists at the 2002 Winter Olympics
New Hampshire Wildcats women's ice hockey players
Olympic gold medalists for the United States in ice hockey
Olympic silver medalists for the United States in ice hockey
Sportspeople from Greenwich, Connecticut